The South African Council of Churches (SACC) is an interdenominational forum in South Africa. It was a prominent anti-apartheid organisation during the years of apartheid in South Africa. Its leaders have included Desmond Tutu, Beyers Naudé and Frank Chikane. It is a member of the Fellowship of Christian Councils in Southern Africa.

Values 
“The South African Council of Churches exists to lead common Christian action that works for moral witness in South Africa, addressing issues of justice, national reconciliation, integrity or creation, eradication of poverty, and contributing towards the empowerment of all those who are spiritually, socially and economically marginalised.”

Leadership 
The SACC is governed by a national conference that meets once every three years. The resolutions of the conference are implemented by a central committee that meets annually. The committee is chaired by either the president or a vice-president of the Council. An executive committee is elected by the central committee and meets at least four times a year. The officers of the Council include a president, vice-presidents, and a general secretary who acts as executive officer.

General Secretaries
[dates need verification]
 Bishop Malusi Mpumlwana (Ethiopian Episcopal Church), 2015 – Current
 Rev Mautji Pataki (Uniting Presbyterian Church in Southern Africa), 2011– 2014
 Mr Edwin Makue (Uniting Reformed Church in Southern Africa), 2006-2011
 Dr Molefe Tsele (Evangelical Lutheran Church in Southern Africa), 2001–2006
 Rev Charity Majiza (Presbyterian Church), 1998–2000
 Ms Brigalia Bam (Church of the Province of South Africa), 1994–1998
 Rev Frank Chikane (Apostolic Faith Mission), 1987–1994
 Rev Dr CF Beyers Naudé (Reformed Church in Africa), 1984–1986?
 Archbishop Desmond Mpilo Tutu (Church of the Province of South Africa), 1978–1984
 Rev John Thorne (United Congregational Church), 1977 (3 months)
 Mr John Rees (Methodist Church of Southern Africa), 1970–1977
 Archbishop Bill Burnett (Church of the Province of South Africa), 1967–1969

Presidents
[dates need verification]
Bishop Ziphozihle Siwa ( Methodist Church of Southern Africa) 2014+ Current
 Bishop Jo Seoka (Anglican Church of Southern Africa), 2010–2014
 Prof. Tinyiko Sam Maluleke (Evangelical Presbyterian Church in South Africa), 2007-2010
 Prof. Russel Botman (Uniting Reformed Church in Southern Africa), 2003–2007
 Presiding Bishop Mvume Dandala (Methodist Church of Southern Africa), 1998–2003
 Bishop Sigqibo Dwane (Order of Ethiopia), 1995–1998
 Dr Khoza Mgojo (Methodist Church of Southern Africa), 1990–1995
 Dr Manas Buthulezi (Evangelical Lutheran Church in Southern Africa), 1983–1990
 Bishop Peter Storey (Methodist Church of Southern Africa), 1981–1983
 Rev SPE Sam Buti (Reformed Church in Africa), ca. 1979
 Rev John Thorne (United Congregational Church), ca. 1975–1976
 Rev A.W. Habelgaarn (Moravian Church), 1971–?
 Archbishop Robert Selby Taylor (Church of the Province of South Africa), 1968

History of the SACC

1988 bombing of Khotso House
The SACC headquarters at Khotso House in Johannesburg were destroyed by a bomb on August 31, 1988. The Truth and Reconciliation Commission later found that State President P. W. Botha had personally ordered the bombing. Former Minister of Law and Order Adriaan Vlok and several senior policemen applied for and were granted amnesty for the bombing. The bombing party was directed by Eugene de Kock, then commander at Vlakplaas, a secret facility of the security branch of the South African Police force.

Alliance with the ANC
During the anti-apartheid struggle, the SACC was in alliance with liberation movements such as the African National Congress (ANC). In recent times, there have been claims that the ANC has marginalised the Council in favour of Pastor Ray McCauley's National Interfaith Leadership Council which the SACC was excluded from and that there are also tensions between the two organisations. The SACC has also been extremely critical of the ANC for its role in the September 2009 militia attacks on Kennedy Road informal settlement calling for an independent investigation into police inaction and the release of community leaders associated with Abahlali baseMjondolo and the Kennedy Road Development Committee.

References

External links
 
 Come celebrate! 25 years of the SACC, 1968–1993
 South African Council of Churches submission to the Truth and Reconciliation Commission, August 1997

National councils of churches
Opposition to apartheid in South Africa
Organisations based in Johannesburg
Religion in South Africa